Singhi Kangri is a  peak in the Karakoram range. It is located on the border between China and India. The mountain was first climbed in 1976 by a Japanese expedition.

See also
 List of highest mountains

References

External links
 "Singhi Kangri" on Peakbagger
 

Mountains of Xinjiang
Mountains of Ladakh
Seven-thousanders of the Karakoram